Villers-lès-Nancy (literally Villers near Nancy) is a commune in the Meurthe-et-Moselle department in north-eastern France.

Inhabitants are known as Villarois.

Geography
Villers-lès-Nancy is a suburb on the southwest of Nancy. The commune goes from Nancy to the Haye forest.

It is composed of three quarters :
 the Mairie-Placieux quarter, which is the closest to Nancy,
 the Botanique-Village quarter, which goes from the Jardin botanique du Montet to the Brabois plateau,
 the Clairlieu quarter, in a large opening of the Haye forest, beyond the A 33.

The neighbourhood communes of the Grand Nancy are : Laxou, Nancy and Vandœuvre-lès-Nancy.

Population

Points of interest
 Jardin botanique du Montet

Mayors
 François Villard, 1791
 Jean Claude Charbonnier, 1791
 François Villard, 1792
 Dieudonné Pierson, 1794
 François Villard, 1794
 Dieudonné Pierson, 1799
 François Houard, 1816
 Lefebvre, 1821
 Jean Claude Clement, 1831
 François Pierson, 1848
 Amédée Lefebre de Monjoie, 1871
 Hubert Simon, 1875
 Louis Valet, 1888
 Anatole de Scitivaux de Greische, 1900
 Louis Porry, 1912
 Louis Pierson de Brabois, 1915
 Charles Oudille, 1919
 Hyppolyte Briot, 1927
 Albert Cattenoz, 1935
 Martial Mourot, 1942
 Maurice Andre, 1944
 Raymond Villaume, 1945
 James Moisson, 1947
 Paul Muller, 1965
 Jean Bernardaux, 1980
 Pascal Jacquemin, 2001

Twin towns
  Oerlinghausen, Germany, 1988

Events
 Fête des Vendanges, a wine harvest celebration that occurs at the end of August/beginning of September
 Faites du solaire, another feast that occurs each year in October

See also
 Communes of the Meurthe-et-Moselle department

References

External links

 Official website of Villers-lès-Nancy
 Nancy spéléodrome, localized on in Villers-lès-Nancy

Villerslesnancy